Raymond C. Eubanks Jr. (December 18, 1933 – March 23, 2022) was an American politician. He served as a member of the South Carolina House of Representatives.

Life and career 
Eubanks was born in Spartanburg, South Carolina. He attended Spartanburg High School, Wofford College and the University of South Carolina School of Law. He served in the United States Air Force.

In 1965, Eubanks was elected to the South Carolina House of Representatives, representing Spartanburg County, South Carolina. He then ran for the senate in 1968 but lost to Paul M. Moore. In 1980, he was appointed by Governor Richard Riley to serve as a probate judge in Spartanburg County.

Eubanks died in March 2022, at the age of 88. He had been married to Carolyn West Eubanks who died in 2020 and with whom he had two children.

References 

1933 births
2022 deaths
Politicians from Spartanburg, South Carolina
Members of the South Carolina House of Representatives
20th-century American politicians
Wofford College alumni
University of South Carolina School of Law alumni
Probate court judges in the United States
20th-century American judges